Patrick Ian Wisdom (born August 27, 1991) is an American professional baseball third baseman and first baseman for the Chicago Cubs of Major League Baseball (MLB). He played college baseball for the Saint Mary's Gaels. He was drafted by the St. Louis Cardinals in the first round of the 2012 MLB draft and he made his MLB debut in 2018. He previously played in MLB for the Cardinals and Texas Rangers.

Career

Amateur career
Wisdom attended Murrieta Valley High School in Murrieta, California. He played for the baseball team and had a .345 batting average in his senior year. He graduated in 2009.

After graduating, Wisdom enrolled at Saint Mary's College of California and played college baseball for the Saint Mary's Gaels. In three seasons he was a career .303 hitter and third all-time in home runs with 29. He was named to the All-West Coast Conference First Team in 2011, and the All-WCC Freshman Team in 2010.

St. Louis Cardinals
The St. Louis Cardinals selected Wisdom in the first round, with the 52nd overall selection, of the 2012 Major League Baseball draft. He signed and spent 2012 with the Batavia Muckdogs where he batted .282 with six home runs and 32 RBIs in 65 games. In 2013, Wisdom played with the Peoria Chiefs and Palm Beach Cardinals, batting a combined .235/.313/.401 with 15 home runs, 73 RBIs, and 137 strikeouts in 129 total games between both teams. 

In 2014, he played for the Springfield Cardinals where he slashed .215/.277/.367 with 14 home runs, 53 RBIs, and  149 strikeouts (2nd in the Texas League) in 128 games, while playing third base where he made 26 errors and had a .928 fielding percentage. Wisdom returned to Springfield in 2015 where he batted .237/.294/.406 with 14 home runs, 61 RBIs, and 107 strikeouts (7th in the Texas League) in 114 games.  

He spent the 2016 season with the Memphis Redbirds where he batted .233/.303./.374 with five home runs and 30 RBIs in 78 games. He returned to Memphis for the 2017 season, posting a .243 batting average with 31 home runs (tied for 4th in the PCL), 89 RBIs (tied for 7th), and 149 strikeouts (2nd) in 127 games.

Wisdom began 2018 back with Memphis. He was promoted to the major leagues on August 11, 2018, and he made his major league debut the next day at Kauffman Stadium versus the Kansas City Royals, collecting two hits and one RBI. He finished his 2018 campaign batting .260 with four home runs and ten RBIs in 32 games.

Texas Rangers
On December 11, 2018, Wisdom was traded to the Texas Rangers in exchange for Drew Robinson. In 2019, Wisdom was optioned to the Triple-A Nashville Sounds to open the season. On April 7, 2019, Wisdom was recalled to the major league roster when Ronald Guzmán was placed on the injured list. On July 6, Wisdom was designated for assignment. 

On July 10, he cleared waivers and was outrighted to Nashville. He finished the season with Nashville hitting .240/.330/.513 with 31 home runs, 74 RBIs, and 125 strikeouts. With Texas in the major leagues he batted .154/.185/.192 with 15 strikeouts in 26 at bats. He became a free agent following the 2019 season.

Seattle Mariners
On November 27, 2019, Wisdom signed a one-year major league contract with the Seattle Mariners. On August 10, 2020, Wisdom was designated for assignment without appearing in a game for Seattle. He was released on August 14.

Chicago Cubs
On August 23, 2020, Wisdom signed a minor league contract with the Chicago Cubs organization. On September 25, Wisdom was selected to the 40-man and active rosters. He made his first appearance of 2020 that day as a pinch hitter for Anthony Rizzo. Wisdom was designated for assignment on September 27 following the promotion of Brailyn Márquez. Wisdom elected free agency on October 7, 2020. 

Wisdom signed a minor league contract with a non-roster invitation to spring training with the Cubs for the 2021 season. He started the season with the Iowa Cubs. Wisdom was selected to the active roster on May 25. On May 31, Wisdom hit a pair of solo home runs in a Wrigley Field game against the San Diego Padres. The following day Wisdom hit another, giving him four home runs in eight games with the Cubs. On June 7, Wisdom was named the NL Player of the Week, after hitting .435 (10-for-23) with a 1.719 OPS and 6 home runs. He also became one of three players to hit as many as seven homers within their first eight starts with a team, joining Colorado Rockies shortstop Trevor Story (2016) and Cincinnati Reds outfielder Aristides Aquino (2019). On September 19, he hit his 27th home run, breaking the record for most home runs by a Cubs rookie set by Kris Bryant in 2015. 

Wisdom finished the 2021 season batting .231/.305/.518 with 28 home runs, 61 RBIs, and 163 strikeouts (9th in the NL) in 106 games. He struck out in 44.1% of his at bats against left-handers, the highest percentage in the major leagues, and struck out in 40.8% of all of his at bats.

In 2022 he led the majors in strikeout rate (34.3%), and batted .207/.298/.426 with 25 home runs, 66 RBIs, and 183 strikeouts (2nd in the NL) in 134 games, while at third base he was second in the league in errors (14).

Personal
Wisdom and his wife, Caroline, have two children.

References

External links

1991 births
Living people
People from Murrieta, California
Baseball players from California
Major League Baseball infielders
St. Louis Cardinals players
Texas Rangers players
Chicago Cubs players
Saint Mary's Gaels baseball players
Gulf Coast Cardinals players
Batavia Muckdogs players
Peoria Chiefs players
Palm Beach Cardinals players
Springfield Cardinals players
Surprise Saguaros players
Memphis Redbirds players
Nashville Sounds players
Peninsula Oilers players